Bjo or BJO may refer to:
 Bundesjugendorchester, the national youth orchestra of Germany
 Bjo Awards
 Bjo Trimble, American science fiction fan and writer
 British Journal of Ophthalmology
 British Junior Open Squash